Mala xiang guo, roughly translated into English as "spicy stir-fry hot pot", is a Chinese dish prepared by stir frying. Strongly flavored with mala, it often contains meat and vegetables, and has a salty and spicy taste. The preparation process involves placing the required ingredients in the pot, stir frying and adding seasoning. In restaurants, customers usually choose the ingredients (meat and vegetables) by themselves before the chef prepares the dish.

Mala xiang guo was introduced by the Burmese Chinese people to Myanmar, and is now a popular dish there, where it is called mala shan gaw (မာလာရှမ်းကော).

History 
Mala Xiang Guo originated from the Tujia people in Jinyun Mountain, Chongqing, and it is a home-style dish that is popular locally. People there usually like making this dish with various seasonings in a large pot. When they have guests visiting them, they will add meat, seafood, bamboo, and tofu skin to the pot to treat their guests. Recently, with its increase in popularity in China, Mala Xiang Guo has expanded to include hundreds of different ingredients.

See also 
 Chongqing hot pot
 Malatang

References 

Chinese cuisine